Sei forte, maestro is an Italian television series.

The television Series challenged to Raiuno, the fiction La famiglia Benvenuti.

Cast
Emilio Solfrizzi: Emilio Ricci
Gaia De Laurentiis: Barbara Loriani
Gastone Moschin: Vittorio Ricci
Valeria Fabrizi: Lucina Nardi
Federica Citarella: Sabrina Ricci
Francesca Rettondini: Claudia Martini
Massimo Ciavarro: Giulio Labua

See also
List of Italian television series

External links
 

Italian television series
2000 Italian television series debuts
2001 Italian television series endings
Canale 5 original programming